The Three Hearts (Polish: Trzy serca) is a 1939 Polish romantic comedy film directed by Michał Waszyński and starring Jerzy Pichelski, Aleksander Żabczyński and Elżbieta Barszczewska. It was based on a novel by Tadeusz Dołęga-Mostowicz.

Cast
 Jerzy Pichelski - Maciek Tyniecki / Maciek Kudro
 Aleksander Żabczyński - Gogo Kudro
 Elżbieta Barszczewska - Kasia
 Leokadia Pancewicz-Leszczyńska - Countess Matylda Tyniecka
 Zofia Lindorf - Michalinka Zurda
 Tadeusz Białoszczyński - Aleksander Kudro
 Aleksander Zelwerowicz - Uncle Seweryn Tukałło
 Helena Buczyńska - Aunt Betsy
 Janina Krzymuska - Aunt Klotylda 'Klocia'
 Stanislaw Łapiński - Land Steward
 Feliks Chmurkowski - Mr. Kolicz
 Stanisław Grolicki - Apartment Superintendent
 Jerzy Chodecki - Lawyer

Bibliography
 Skaff, Sheila. The Law of the Looking Glass: Cinema in Poland, 1896-1939. Ohio University Press, 2008.

External links

1939 films
Polish romantic comedy films
1930s Polish-language films
Films directed by Michał Waszyński
Films based on Polish novels
Films based on works by Tadeusz Dołęga-Mostowicz
Polish black-and-white films
1939 romantic comedy films